Nicolae Matei (1863–1933) was a Romanian politician who served as Deputy from 1905 to 1914 and as Senator from 1914 to 1933. 

He married first Aglaia Popovici in 1893 and second time Smaranda Tașcă in 1920. His first wife died in 1917 during World War I in a shrapnel blast. His second wife was an agriculturist who had been trained in Germany under a special scholarship program sponsored by Queen Elisabeth of Romania.

The estate was inherited by his male offspring, Virgiliu, but was expropriated in March 1949 after the rise to power of the communist regime. Eventually his offspring moved to Cork, Ireland where both his granddaughter, Ruxandra Colan Petcu, and his great-granddaughter Ioana Petcu-Colan, have pursued careers as musicians.

References

1863 births
1933 deaths
Members of the Chamber of Deputies (Romania)
Members of the Senate of Romania
Romanian landowners
People from Bacău County